Live at Jazzfestival Saalfelden 2011 is an album by American jazz saxophonist David S. Ware released on the AUM Fidelity label.  It documents the second live performance by Ware's band Planetary Unknown following its world premiere at Vision Festival 16 in New York.

Reception

The All About Jazz review by John Sharpe says that "this is long-form improvisation, where the group navigates towards a satisfactory ending, guided by an innate sense of structure, outstanding instrumental prowess and keen appreciation of each others' contribution." 

The Down Beat review by Alain Drouot states "Four individualities, each capable of steering the music in one direction or shaping the music, an intuitive sense of placement, and a clear focus that prevents the band from getting carried away are enough to explain why Planetary Unknown is one of the strongest free-jazz units at the moment."

In his review for JazzTimes Scott Verrastro notes that "It's hard to fathom that the median age of this ensemble is 66 years old, as they burn with more passion than many who could be their grandchildren. This extremely elevated level of empathic interplay could only be achieved by years of experience and artistic engagement."

The Wondering Sound review by Steve Holtje claims "This is music of remarkable intensity, ebbing and flowing organically but always tautly conceived."

Track listing
All compositions by Ware / Cooper-Moore / Parker / Ali
 "Precessional 1" - 33:15  
 "Precessional 2" - 19:04   
 "Precessional 3" - 14:37

Personnel
David S. Ware – tenor saxophone
Cooper-Moore - piano
William Parker – bass
Muhammad Ali – drums

References

2012 live albums
David S. Ware live albums
AUM Fidelity live albums